Dark matter is a hypothetical form of matter thought to account for approximately 85% of the matter in the universe. Dark matter is called "dark" because it does not appear to interact with the electromagnetic field, which means it does not absorb, reflect, or emit electromagnetic radiation and is, therefore, difficult to detect. Various astrophysical observationsincluding gravitational effects which cannot be explained by currently accepted theories of gravity unless more matter is present than can be seenimply dark matter's presence. For this reason, most experts think that dark matter is abundant in the universe and has had a strong influence on its structure and evolution.

The primary evidence for dark matter comes from calculations showing that many galaxies would behave quite differently if they did not contain a large amount of unseen matter. Some galaxies would not have formed at all and others would not move as they currently do. Other lines of evidence include observations in gravitational lensing and the cosmic microwave background, along with astronomical observations of the observable universe's current structure, the formation and evolution of galaxies, mass location during galactic collisions, and the motion of galaxies within galaxy clusters. In the standard Lambda-CDM model of cosmology, the total mass-energy content of the universe contains 5% ordinary matter, 26.8% dark matter, and 68.2% of a form of energy known as dark energy. Thus, dark matter constitutes 85% of the total mass, while dark energy and dark matter constitute 95% of the total mass-energy content.

Because no one has directly observed dark matter yetassuming it existsit must barely interact with ordinary baryonic matter and radiation except through gravity. Dark matter is thought to be non-baryonic; it may be composed of some as-yet-undiscovered subatomic particles. The primary candidate for dark matter is some new kind of elementary particle that has not yet been discovered, particularly weakly interacting massive particles (WIMPs). Many experiments to detect and study dark matter particles directly are being actively undertaken, but none have yet succeeded. Dark matter is classified as "cold", "warm", or "hot" according to its velocity (more precisely, its free streaming length). Current models favor a cold dark matter scenario, in which structures emerge by the gradual accumulation of particles.

Although the scientific community generally accepts dark matter's existence, some astrophysicists, intrigued by specific observations that are not well-explained by ordinary dark matter, argue for various modifications of the standard laws of general relativity. These include modified Newtonian dynamics, tensor–vector–scalar gravity, or entropic gravity. These models attempt to account for all observations without invoking supplemental non-baryonic matter.

History

Early history 
The hypothesis of dark matter has an elaborate history. In the appendices of the book 'Baltimore lectures on molecular dynamics and the wave theory of light' where the main text was based on a series of lectures given in 1884, Lord Kelvin discussed the potential number of stars around the sun from the observed velocity dispersion of the stars near the sun, assuming that the sun was 20 to 100 million years old. He posed what would happen if there were a thousand million stars within 1 kilo-parsec of the sun (at which distance their parallax would be 1 millli-arcsec).  Lord Kelvin concluded "Many of our supposed thousand million stars, perhaps a great majority of them, may be dark bodies". In 1906, Henri Poincaré in "The Milky Way and Theory of Gases" used the French term  ("dark matter") in discussing Kelvin's work.  He found that the amount of dark matter would need to be less than that of visible matter.

The second to suggest the existence of dark matter using stellar velocities was Dutch astronomer Jacobus Kapteyn in 1922. A publication from 1930 points to Swedish Knut Lundmark being the first to realise that the universe must contain much more mass than we can observe. Dutchman and radio astronomy pioneer Jan Oort also hypothesized the existence of dark matter in 1932. Oort was studying stellar motions in the local galactic neighborhood and found the mass in the galactic plane must be greater than what was observed, but this measurement was later determined to be erroneous.

In 1933, Swiss astrophysicist Fritz Zwicky, who studied galaxy clusters while working at the California Institute of Technology, made a similar inference. Zwicky applied the virial theorem to the Coma Cluster and obtained evidence of unseen mass he called dunkle Materie ('dark matter'). Zwicky estimated its mass based on the motions of galaxies near its edge and compared that to an estimate based on its brightness and number of galaxies. He estimated the cluster had about 400 times more mass than was visually observable. The gravity effect of the visible galaxies was far too small for such fast orbits, thus mass must be hidden from view. Based on these conclusions, Zwicky inferred some unseen matter provided the mass and associated gravitation attraction to hold the cluster together. Zwicky's estimates were off by more than an order of magnitude, mainly due to an obsolete value of the Hubble constant; the same calculation today shows a smaller fraction, using greater values for luminous mass. Nonetheless, Zwicky did correctly conclude from his calculation that the bulk of the matter was dark.

Further indications of mass-to-light ratio anomalies came from measurements of galaxy rotation curves. In 1939, Horace W. Babcock reported the rotation curve for the Andromeda nebula (known now as the Andromeda Galaxy), which suggested the mass-to-luminosity ratio increases radially. He attributed it to either light absorption within the galaxy or modified dynamics in the outer portions of the spiral and not to the missing matter he had uncovered. Following Babcock's 1939 report of unexpectedly rapid rotation in the outskirts of the Andromeda galaxy and a mass-to-light ratio of 50; in 1940 Jan Oort discovered and wrote about the large non-visible halo of NGC 3115.

1960s 
Early radio astronomy observations, performed by Seth Shostak, later SETI Institute Senior Astronomer, showed a half-dozen galaxies spun too fast in their outer regions - pointing to the existence of dark matter as a means of creating the gravitational pull needed to keep the stars in their orbits.

1970s 
Vera Rubin, Kent Ford, and Ken Freeman's work in the 1960s and 1970s provided further strong evidence, also using galaxy rotation curves. Rubin and Ford worked with a new spectrograph to measure the velocity curve of edge-on spiral galaxies with greater accuracy. This result was confirmed in 1978. An influential paper presented Rubin and Ford's results in 1980. They showed most galaxies must contain about six times as much dark as visible mass; thus, by around 1980 the apparent need for dark matter was widely recognized as a major unsolved problem in astronomy.

At the same time Rubin and Ford were exploring optical rotation curves, radio astronomers were making use of new radio telescopes to map the 21 cm line of atomic hydrogen in nearby galaxies. The radial distribution of interstellar atomic hydrogen (H-I) often extends to much larger galactic radii than those accessible by optical studies, extending the sampling of rotation curves – and thus of the total mass distribution – to a new dynamical regime. Early mapping of Andromeda with the 300 foot telescope at Green Bank and the 250 foot dish at Jodrell Bank already showed the H-I rotation curve did not trace the expected Keplerian decline. As more sensitive receivers became available, Morton Roberts and Robert Whitehurst were able to trace the rotational velocity of Andromeda to 30 kpc, much beyond the optical measurements. Illustrating the advantage of tracing the gas disk at large radii, Figure 16 of that paper combines the optical data (the cluster of points at radii of less than 15 kpc with a single point further out) with the H-I data between 20–30 kpc, exhibiting the flatness of the outer galaxy rotation curve; the solid curve peaking at the center is the optical surface density, while the other curve shows the cumulative mass, still rising linearly at the outermost measurement. In parallel, the use of interferometric arrays for extragalactic H-I spectroscopy was being developed. In 1972, David Rogstad and Seth Shostak published H-I rotation curves of five spirals mapped with the Owens Valley interferometer; the rotation curves of all five were very flat, suggesting very large values of mass-to-light ratio in the outer parts of their extended H-I disks.

1980s 
A stream of observations in the 1980s supported the presence of dark matter, including gravitational lensing of background objects by galaxy clusters, the temperature distribution of hot gas in galaxies and clusters, and the pattern of anisotropies in the cosmic microwave background. According to consensus among cosmologists, dark matter is composed primarily of a not yet characterized type of subatomic particle. The search for this particle, by a variety of means, is one of the major efforts in particle physics.

Technical definition 

In standard cosmology, matter is anything whose energy density scales with the inverse cube of the scale factor, i.e.,  This is in contrast to radiation, which scales as the inverse fourth power of the scale factor  and a cosmological constant, which is independent of a. The different scale factors for matter and radiation are a consequence of radiation redshift: for example, after gradually doubling the diameter of the observable Universe via cosmic expansion in General Relativity, a has been doubled. The energy of the cosmic background radiation has been halved (because the wavelength of each photon has doubled); the energy of ultra-relativistic particles, such as early-era standard-model neutrinos, is similarly halved. (However, in the modern cosmic era, this neutrino field has cooled and started to behave more like matter and less like radiation.) The cosmological constant, as an intrinsic property of space, has a constant energy density regardless of the volume under consideration.

In principle, "dark matter" means all components of the universe which are not visible but still obey  In practice, the term "dark matter" is often used to mean only the non-baryonic component of dark matter, i.e., excluding "missing baryons". Context will usually indicate which meaning is intended.

Observational evidence

Galaxy rotation curves 

The arms of spiral galaxies rotate around the galactic center. The luminous mass density of a spiral galaxy decreases as one goes from the center to the outskirts. If luminous mass were all the matter, then we can model the galaxy as a point mass in the centre and test masses orbiting around it, similar to the Solar System. From Kepler's Second Law, it is expected that the rotation velocities will decrease with distance from the center, similar to the Solar System. This is not observed. Instead, the galaxy rotation curve remains flat as distance from the center increases.

If Kepler's laws are correct, then the obvious way to resolve this discrepancy is to conclude the mass distribution in spiral galaxies is not similar to that of the Solar System. In particular, there is a lot of non-luminous matter (dark matter) in the outskirts of the galaxy.

Velocity dispersions 

Stars in bound systems must obey the virial theorem. The theorem, together with the measured velocity distribution, can be used to measure the mass distribution in a bound system, such as elliptical galaxies or globular clusters. With some exceptions, velocity dispersion estimates of elliptical galaxies do not match the predicted velocity dispersion from the observed mass distribution, even assuming complicated distributions of stellar orbits.

As with galaxy rotation curves, the obvious way to resolve the discrepancy is to postulate the existence of non-luminous matter.

Galaxy clusters 
Galaxy clusters are particularly important for dark matter studies since their masses can be estimated in three independent ways:
 From the scatter in radial velocities of the galaxies within clusters
 From X-rays emitted by hot gas in the clusters. From the X-ray energy spectrum and flux, the gas temperature and density can be estimated, hence giving the pressure; assuming pressure and gravity balance determines the cluster's mass profile.
 Gravitational lensing (usually of more distant galaxies) can measure cluster masses without relying on observations of dynamics (e.g., velocity).

Generally, these three methods are in reasonable agreement that dark matter outweighs visible matter by approximately 5 to 1.

Gravitational lensing 

One of the consequences of general relativity is massive objects (such as a cluster of galaxies) lying between a more distant source (such as a quasar) and an observer should act as a lens to bend light from this source. The more massive an object, the more lensing is observed.

Strong lensing is the observed distortion of background galaxies into arcs when their light passes through such a gravitational lens. It has been observed around many distant clusters including Abell 1689. By measuring the distortion geometry, the mass of the intervening cluster can be obtained. In the dozens of cases where this has been done, the mass-to-light ratios obtained correspond to the dynamical dark matter measurements of clusters. Lensing can lead to multiple copies of an image. By analyzing the distribution of multiple image copies, scientists have been able to deduce and map the distribution of dark matter around the MACS J0416.1-2403 galaxy cluster.

Weak gravitational lensing investigates minute distortions of galaxies, using statistical analyses from vast galaxy surveys. By examining the apparent shear deformation of the adjacent background galaxies, the mean distribution of dark matter can be characterized. The mass-to-light ratios correspond to dark matter densities predicted by other large-scale structure measurements. Dark matter does not bend light itself; mass (in this case the mass of the dark matter) bends spacetime. Light follows the curvature of spacetime, resulting in the lensing effect.

In May 2021, a new detailed dark matter map was revealed by the Dark Energy Survey Collaboration. In addition, the map revealed previously undiscovered filamentary structures connecting galaxies, by using a machine learning method.

Cosmic microwave background 

Although both dark matter and ordinary matter are matter, they do not behave in the same way. In particular, in the early universe, ordinary matter was ionized and interacted strongly with radiation via Thomson scattering. Dark matter does not interact directly with radiation, but it does affect the cosmic microwave background (CMB) by its gravitational potential (mainly on large scales) and by its effects on the density and velocity of ordinary matter. Ordinary and dark matter perturbations, therefore, evolve differently with time and leave different imprints on the CMB.

The cosmic microwave background is very close to a perfect blackbody but contains very small temperature anisotropies of a few parts in 100,000. A sky map of anisotropies can be decomposed into an angular power spectrum, which is observed to contain a series of acoustic peaks at near-equal spacing but different heights.
The series of peaks can be predicted for any assumed set of cosmological parameters by modern computer codes such as CMBFAST and CAMB, and matching theory to data, therefore, constrains cosmological parameters. The first peak mostly shows the density of baryonic matter, while the third peak relates mostly to the density of dark matter, measuring the density of matter and the density of atoms.

The CMB anisotropy was first discovered by COBE in 1992, though this had too coarse resolution to detect the acoustic peaks.
After the discovery of the first acoustic peak by the balloon-borne BOOMERanG experiment in 2000, the power spectrum was precisely observed by WMAP in 2003–2012, and even more precisely by the Planck spacecraft in 2013–2015. The results support the Lambda-CDM model.

The observed CMB angular power spectrum provides powerful evidence in support of dark matter, as its precise structure is well fitted by the Lambda-CDM model, but difficult to reproduce with any competing model such as modified Newtonian dynamics (MOND).

Structure formation 

Structure formation refers to the period after the Big Bang when density perturbations collapsed to form stars, galaxies, and clusters. Prior to structure formation, the Friedmann solutions to general relativity describe a homogeneous universe. Later, small anisotropies gradually grew and condensed the homogeneous universe into stars, galaxies and larger structures. Ordinary matter is affected by radiation, which is the dominant element of the universe at very early times. As a result, its density perturbations are washed out and unable to condense into structure. If there were only ordinary matter in the universe, there would not have been enough time for density perturbations to grow into the galaxies and clusters currently seen.

Dark matter provides a solution to this problem because it is unaffected by radiation. Therefore, its density perturbations can grow first. The resulting gravitational potential acts as an attractive potential well for ordinary matter collapsing later, speeding up the structure formation process.

Bullet Cluster 

If dark matter does not exist, then the next most likely explanation must be that general relativity – the prevailing theory of gravity – is incorrect and should be modified. The Bullet Cluster, the result of a recent collision of two galaxy clusters, provides a challenge for modified gravity theories because its apparent center of mass is far displaced from the baryonic center of mass. Standard dark matter models can easily explain this observation, but modified gravity has a much harder time, especially since the observational evidence is model-independent.

Type Ia supernova distance measurements 

Type Ia supernovae can be used as standard candles to measure extragalactic distances, which can in turn be used to measure how fast the universe has expanded in the past. Data indicates the universe is expanding at an accelerating rate, the cause of which is usually ascribed to dark energy. Since observations indicate the universe is almost flat, it is expected the total energy density of everything in the universe should sum to 1. This leaves a missing  which nonetheless behaves like matter (see technical definition section above) dark matter.

Sky surveys and baryon acoustic oscillations 

Baryon acoustic oscillations (BAO) are fluctuations in the density of the visible baryonic matter (normal matter) of the universe on large scales. These are predicted to arise in the Lambda-CDM model due to acoustic oscillations in the photon–baryon fluid of the early universe, and can be observed in the cosmic microwave background angular power spectrum. BAOs set up a preferred length scale for baryons. As the dark matter and baryons clumped together after recombination, the effect is much weaker in the galaxy distribution in the nearby universe, but is detectable as a subtle (≈1 percent) preference for pairs of galaxies to be separated by 147 Mpc, compared to those separated by 130–160 Mpc. This feature was predicted theoretically in the 1990s and then discovered in 2005, in two large galaxy redshift surveys, the Sloan Digital Sky Survey and the 2dF Galaxy Redshift Survey. Combining the CMB observations with BAO measurements from galaxy redshift surveys provides a precise estimate of the Hubble constant and the average matter density in the Universe. The results support the Lambda-CDM model.

Redshift-space distortions 
Large galaxy redshift surveys may be used to make a three-dimensional map of the galaxy distribution. These maps are slightly distorted because distances are estimated from observed redshifts; the redshift contains a contribution from the galaxy's so-called peculiar velocity in addition to the dominant Hubble expansion term. On average, superclusters are expanding more slowly than the cosmic mean due to their gravity, while voids are expanding faster than average. In a redshift map, galaxies in front of a supercluster have excess radial velocities towards it and have redshifts slightly higher than their distance would imply, while galaxies behind the supercluster have redshifts slightly low for their distance. This effect causes superclusters to appear squashed in the radial direction, and likewise voids are stretched. Their angular positions are unaffected. This effect is not detectable for any one structure since the true shape is not known, but can be measured by averaging over many structures. It was predicted quantitatively by Nick Kaiser in 1987, and first decisively measured in 2001 by the 2dF Galaxy Redshift Survey. Results are in agreement with the Lambda-CDM model.

Lyman-alpha forest 

In astronomical spectroscopy, the Lyman-alpha forest is the sum of the absorption lines arising from the Lyman-alpha transition of neutral hydrogen in the spectra of distant galaxies and quasars. Lyman-alpha forest observations can also constrain cosmological models. These constraints agree with those obtained from WMAP data.

Theoretical classifications

Composition 
There are various hypotheses about what dark matter could consist of, as set out in the table below.

Dark matter can refer to any substance which interacts predominantly via gravity with visible matter (e.g., stars and planets). Hence in principle it need not be composed of a new type of fundamental particle but could, at least in part, be made up of standard baryonic matter, such as protons or neutrons.

Baryonic matter 

Most of the ordinary matter familiar to astronomers, including planets, brown dwarfs, red dwarfs, visible stars, white dwarfs, neutron stars, and black holes, is called baryonic matter (referring to the baryons that dominate the mass of most ordinary matter). Solitary black holes, neutron stars, burnt-out dwarfs, and other massive objects that that are hard to detect are collectively known as MACHOs; some scientists initially hoped that baryonic MACHOs could account for and explain all the dark matter.

However, multiple lines of evidence suggest the majority of dark matter is not baryonic:
 Sufficient diffuse, baryonic gas or dust would be visible when backlit by stars.
 The theory of Big Bang nucleosynthesis predicts the observed abundance of the chemical elements. If there are more baryons, then there should also be more helium, lithium and heavier elements synthesized during the Big Bang. Agreement with observed abundances requires that baryonic matter makes up between 4–5% of the universe's critical density. In contrast, large-scale structure and other observations indicate that the total matter density is about 30% of the critical density.
 Astronomical searches for gravitational microlensing in the Milky Way found at most only a small fraction of the dark matter may be in dark, compact, conventional objects (MACHOs, etc.); the excluded range of object masses is from half the Earth's mass up to 30 solar masses, which covers nearly all the plausible candidates.
 Detailed analysis of the small irregularities (anisotropies) in the cosmic microwave background. Observations by WMAP and Planck indicate that around five-sixths of the total matter is in a form that interacts significantly with ordinary matter or photons only through gravitational effects.

Non-baryonic matter 
Candidates for non-baryonic dark matter are hypothetical particles such as axions, sterile neutrinos, weakly interacting massive particles (WIMPs), supersymmetric particles, or geons. The three neutrino types already observed are indeed abundant, and dark, and matter, but because their individual masses – however uncertain they may be – are almost certainly too tiny, they can only supply a small fraction of dark matter, due to limits derived from large-scale structure and high-redshift galaxies.

Unlike baryonic matter, nonbaryonic matter did not contribute to the formation of the elements in the early universe (Big Bang nucleosynthesis) and so its presence is revealed only via its gravitational effects, or weak lensing. In addition, if the particles of which it is composed are supersymmetric, they can undergo annihilation interactions with themselves, possibly resulting in observable by-products such as gamma rays and neutrinos (indirect detection).

Dark matter aggregation and dense dark matter objects
If dark matter is composed of weakly-interacting particles, then an obvious question is whether it can form objects equivalent to planets, stars, or black holes. Historically, the answer has been it cannot, because of two factors:
It lacks an efficient means to lose energy 
Ordinary matter forms dense objects because it has numerous ways to lose energy. Losing energy would be essential for object formation, because a particle that gains energy during compaction or falling "inward" under gravity, and cannot lose it any other way, will heat up and increase velocity and momentum. Dark matter appears to lack a means to lose energy, simply because it is not capable of interacting strongly in other ways except through gravity. The virial theorem suggests that such a particle would not stay bound to the gradually forming object – as the object began to form and compact, the dark matter particles within it would speed up and tend to escape.
It lacks a range of interactions needed to form structures
Ordinary matter interacts in many different ways, which allows the matter to form more complex structures. For example, stars form through gravity, but the particles within them interact and can emit energy in the form of neutrinos and electromagnetic radiation through fusion when they become energetic enough. Protons and neutrons can bind via the strong interaction and then form atoms with electrons largely through electromagnetic interaction. There is no evidence that dark matter is capable of such a wide variety of interactions, since it seems to only interact through gravity (and possibly through some means no stronger than the weak interaction, although until dark matter is better understood, this is only speculation).

In 2015–2017, the idea that dense dark matter was composed of primordial black holes made a comeback following results of gravitational wave measurements which detected the merger of intermediate-mass black holes. Black holes with about 30 solar masses are not predicted to form by either stellar collapse (typically less than 15 solar masses) or by the merger of black holes in galactic centers (millions or billions of solar masses). It was proposed that the intermediate-mass black holes causing the detected merger formed in the hot dense early phase of the universe due to denser regions collapsing. A later survey of about a thousand supernovae detected no gravitational lensing events, when about eight would be expected if intermediate-mass primordial black holes above a certain mass range accounted for the majority of dark matter.

The possibility that atom-sized primordial black holes account for a significant fraction of dark matter was ruled out by measurements of positron and electron fluxes outside the Sun's heliosphere by the Voyager 1 spacecraft. Tiny black holes are theorized to emit Hawking radiation. However the detected fluxes were too low and did not have the expected energy spectrum, suggesting that tiny primordial black holes are not widespread enough to account for dark matter. Nonetheless, research and theories proposing dense dark matter accounts for dark matter continue as of 2018, including approaches to dark matter cooling, and the question remains unsettled. In 2019, the lack of microlensing effects in the observation of Andromeda suggests that tiny black holes do not exist.

However, there still exists a largely unconstrained mass range smaller than that which can be limited by optical microlensing observations, where primordial black holes may account for all dark matter.

Free streaming length 
Dark matter can be divided into cold, warm, and hot categories. These categories refer to velocity rather than an actual temperature, indicating how far corresponding objects moved due to random motions in the early universe, before they slowed due to cosmic expansion – this is an important distance called the free streaming length (FSL). Primordial density fluctuations smaller than this length get washed out as particles spread from overdense to underdense regions, while larger fluctuations are unaffected; therefore this length sets a minimum scale for later structure formation.

The categories are set with respect to the size of a protogalaxy (an object that later evolves into a dwarf galaxy): Dark matter particles are classified as cold, warm, or hot according to their FSL; much smaller (cold), similar to (warm), or much larger (hot) than a protogalaxy. Mixtures of the above are also possible: a theory of mixed dark matter was popular in the mid-1990s, but was rejected following the discovery of dark energy.

Cold dark matter leads to a bottom-up formation of structure with galaxies forming first and galaxy clusters at a latter stage, while hot dark matter would result in a top-down formation scenario with large matter aggregations forming early, later fragmenting into separate galaxies; the latter is excluded by high-redshift galaxy observations.

Fluctuation spectrum effects 
These categories also correspond to fluctuation spectrum effects  and the interval following the Big Bang at which each type became non-relativistic. Davis et al. wrote in 1985:

Alternative definitions 
Another approximate dividing line is warm dark matter became non-relativistic when the universe was approximately 1 year old and 1 millionth of its present size and in the radiation-dominated era (photons and neutrinos), with a photon temperature 2.7 million Kelvins. Standard physical cosmology gives the particle horizon size as 2 c t (speed of light multiplied by time) in the radiation-dominated era, thus 2 light-years. A region of this size would expand to 2 million light-years today (absent structure formation). The actual FSL is approximately 5 times the above length, since it continues to grow slowly as particle velocities decrease inversely with the scale factor after they become non-relativistic. In this example the FSL would correspond to 10 million light-years, or 3 megaparsecs, today, around the size containing an average large galaxy.

The 2.7 million K photon temperature gives a typical photon energy of 250 electronvolts, thereby setting a typical mass scale for warm dark matter: particles much more massive than this, such as GeV–TeV mass WIMPs, would become non-relativistic much earlier than one year after the Big Bang and thus have FSLs much smaller than a protogalaxy, making them cold. Conversely, much lighter particles, such as neutrinos with masses of only a few eV, have FSLs much larger than a protogalaxy, thus qualifying them as hot.

Cold dark matter 

Cold dark matter offers the simplest explanation for most cosmological observations. It is dark matter composed of constituents with an FSL much smaller than a protogalaxy. This is the focus for dark matter research, as hot dark matter does not seem capable of supporting galaxy or galaxy cluster formation, and most particle candidates slowed early.

The constituents of cold dark matter are unknown. Possibilities range from large objects like MACHOs (such as black holes and Preon stars) or RAMBOs (such as clusters of brown dwarfs), to new particles such as WIMPs and axions.

Studies of Big Bang nucleosynthesis and gravitational lensing convinced most cosmologists that MACHOs cannot make up more than a small fraction of dark matter. According to A. Peter: "... the only really plausible dark-matter candidates are new particles."

The 1997 DAMA/NaI experiment and its successor DAMA/LIBRA in 2013, claimed to directly detect dark matter particles passing through the Earth, but many researchers remain skeptical, as negative results from similar experiments seem incompatible with the DAMA results.

Many supersymmetric models offer dark matter candidates in the form of the WIMPy Lightest Supersymmetric Particle (LSP). Separately, heavy sterile neutrinos exist in non-supersymmetric extensions to the standard model which explain the small neutrino mass through the seesaw mechanism.

Warm dark matter 

Warm dark matter comprises particles with an FSL comparable to the size of a protogalaxy. Predictions based on warm dark matter are similar to those for cold dark matter on large scales, but with less small-scale density perturbations. This reduces the predicted abundance of dwarf galaxies and may lead to lower density of dark matter in the central parts of large galaxies. Some researchers consider this a better fit to observations. A challenge for this model is the lack of particle candidates with the required mass ≈ 300 eV to 3000 eV.

No known particles can be categorized as warm dark matter. A postulated candidate is the sterile neutrino: A heavier, slower form of neutrino that does not interact through the weak force, unlike other neutrinos. Some modified gravity theories, such as scalar–tensor–vector gravity, require "warm" dark matter to make their equations work.

Hot dark matter 

Hot dark matter consists of particles whose FSL is much larger than the size of a protogalaxy. The neutrino qualifies as such a particle. They were discovered independently, long before the hunt for dark matter: they were postulated in 1930, and detected in 1956. Neutrinos' mass is less than 10 that of an electron. Neutrinos interact with normal matter only via gravity and the weak force, making them difficult to detect (the weak force only works over a small distance, thus a neutrino triggers a weak force event only if it hits a nucleus head-on). This makes them "weakly interacting slender particles" (WISPs), as opposed to WIMPs.

The three known flavours of neutrinos are the electron, muon, and tau. Their masses are slightly different. Neutrinos oscillate among the flavours as they move. It is hard to determine an exact upper bound on the collective average mass of the three neutrinos (or for any of the three individually). For example, if the average neutrino mass were over 50 eV/c (less than 10 of the mass of an electron), the universe would collapse. CMB data and other methods indicate that their average mass probably does not exceed 0.3 eV/c. Thus, observed neutrinos cannot explain dark matter.

Because galaxy-size density fluctuations get washed out by free-streaming, hot dark matter implies the first objects that can form are huge supercluster-size pancakes, which then fragment into galaxies. Deep-field observations show instead that galaxies formed first, followed by clusters and superclusters as galaxies clump together.

Detection of dark matter particles 
If dark matter is made up of subatomic particles, then millions, possibly billions, of such particles must pass through every square centimeter of the Earth each second. Many experiments aim to test this hypothesis. Although WIMPs have been the main search candidates, axions have drawn renewed attention, with the Axion Dark Matter Experiment (ADMX) searches for axions and many more planned in the future. Another candidate is heavy hidden sector particles which only interact with ordinary matter via gravity.

These experiments can be divided into two classes: direct detection experiments, which search for the scattering of dark matter particles off atomic nuclei within a detector; and indirect detection, which look for the products of dark matter particle annihilations or decays.

Direct detection 

Direct detection experiments aim to observe low-energy recoils (typically a few keVs) of nuclei induced by interactions with particles of dark matter, which (in theory) are passing through the Earth. After such a recoil the nucleus will emit energy in the form of scintillation light or phonons, as they pass through sensitive detection apparatus. To do so effectively, it is crucial to maintain an extremely low background, which is the reason why such experiments typically operate deep underground, where interference from cosmic rays is minimized. Examples of underground laboratories with direct detection experiments include the Stawell mine, the Soudan mine, the SNOLAB underground laboratory at Sudbury, the Gran Sasso National Laboratory, the Canfranc Underground Laboratory, the Boulby Underground Laboratory, the Deep Underground Science and Engineering Laboratory and the China Jinping Underground Laboratory.

These experiments mostly use either cryogenic or noble liquid detector technologies. Cryogenic detectors operating at temperatures below 100 mK, detect the heat produced when a particle hits an atom in a crystal absorber such as germanium. Noble liquid detectors detect scintillation produced by a particle collision in liquid xenon or argon. Cryogenic detector experiments include: CDMS, CRESST, EDELWEISS, EURECA. Noble liquid experiments include LZ, XENON, DEAP, ArDM, WARP, DarkSide, PandaX, and LUX, the Large Underground Xenon experiment. Both of these techniques focus strongly on their ability to distinguish background particles (which predominantly scatter off electrons) from dark matter particles (that scatter off nuclei). Other experiments include SIMPLE and PICASSO.

Currently there has been no well-established claim of dark matter detection from a direct detection experiment, leading instead to strong upper limits on the mass and interaction cross section with nucleons of such dark matter particles. The DAMA/NaI and more recent DAMA/LIBRA experimental collaborations have detected an annual modulation in the rate of events in their detectors, which they claim is due to dark matter. This results from the expectation that as the Earth orbits the Sun, the velocity of the detector relative to the dark matter halo will vary by a small amount. This claim is so far unconfirmed and in contradiction with negative results from other experiments such as LUX, SuperCDMS and XENON100.

A special case of direct detection experiments covers those with directional sensitivity. This is a search strategy based on the motion of the Solar System around the Galactic Center. A low-pressure time projection chamber makes it possible to access information on recoiling tracks and constrain WIMP-nucleus kinematics. WIMPs coming from the direction in which the Sun travels (approximately towards Cygnus) may then be separated from background, which should be isotropic. Directional dark matter experiments include DMTPC, DRIFT, Newage and MIMAC.

Indirect detection 

Indirect detection experiments search for the products of the self-annihilation or decay of dark matter particles in outer space. For example, in regions of high dark matter density (e.g., the centre of our galaxy) two dark matter particles could annihilate to produce gamma rays or Standard Model particle–antiparticle pairs. Alternatively, if a dark matter particle is unstable, it could decay into Standard Model (or other) particles. These processes could be detected indirectly through an excess of gamma rays, antiprotons or positrons emanating from high density regions in our galaxy or others. A major difficulty inherent in such searches is that various astrophysical sources can mimic the signal expected from dark matter, and so multiple signals are likely required for a conclusive discovery.

A few of the dark matter particles passing through the Sun or Earth may scatter off atoms and lose energy. Thus dark matter may accumulate at the center of these bodies, increasing the chance of collision/annihilation. This could produce a distinctive signal in the form of high-energy neutrinos. Such a signal would be strong indirect proof of WIMP dark matter. High-energy neutrino telescopes such as AMANDA, IceCube and ANTARES are searching for this signal.
The detection by LIGO in September 2015 of gravitational waves opens the possibility of observing dark matter in a new way, particularly if it is in the form of primordial black holes.

Many experimental searches have been undertaken to look for such emission from dark matter annihilation or decay, examples of which follow.
The Energetic Gamma Ray Experiment Telescope observed more gamma rays in 2008 than expected from the Milky Way, but scientists concluded this was most likely due to incorrect estimation of the telescope's sensitivity.

The Fermi Gamma-ray Space Telescope is searching for similar gamma rays. In April 2012, an analysis of previously available data from its Large Area Telescope instrument produced statistical evidence of a 130 GeV signal in the gamma radiation coming from the center of the Milky Way. WIMP annihilation was seen as the most probable explanation.

At higher energies, ground-based gamma-ray telescopes have set limits on the annihilation of dark matter in dwarf spheroidal galaxies and in clusters of galaxies.

The PAMELA experiment (launched in 2006) detected excess positrons. They could be from dark matter annihilation or from pulsars. No excess antiprotons were observed.

In 2013 results from the Alpha Magnetic Spectrometer on the International Space Station indicated excess high-energy cosmic rays which could be due to dark matter annihilation.

Collider searches for dark matter 
An alternative approach to the detection of dark matter particles in nature is to produce them in a laboratory. Experiments with the Large Hadron Collider (LHC) may be able to detect dark matter particles produced in collisions of the LHC proton beams. Because a dark matter particle should have negligible interactions with normal visible matter, it may be detected indirectly as (large amounts of) missing energy and momentum that escape the detectors, provided other (non-negligible) collision products are detected. Constraints on dark matter also exist from the LEP experiment using a similar principle, but probing the interaction of dark matter particles with electrons rather than quarks. Any discovery from collider searches must be corroborated by discoveries in the indirect or direct detection sectors to prove that the particle discovered is, in fact, dark matter.

Alternative hypotheses 

Because dark matter has not yet been identified, many other hypotheses have emerged aiming to explain the same observational phenomena without introducing a new unknown type of matter. The most common method is to modify general relativity. General relativity is well-tested on solar system scales, but its validity on galactic or cosmological scales has not been well proven. A suitable modification to general relativity can in principle conceivably eliminate the need for dark matter. The best-known theories of this class are MOND and its relativistic generalization tensor–vector–scalar gravity (TeVeS), f(R) gravity, negative mass, dark fluid, and entropic gravity. Alternative theories abound.

A problem with alternative hypotheses is that observational evidence for dark matter comes from so many independent approaches (see the "observational evidence" section above). Explaining any individual observation is possible but explaining all of them in the absence of dark matter is very difficult. Nonetheless, there have been some scattered successes for alternative hypotheses, such as a 2016 test of gravitational lensing in entropic gravity and a 2020 measurement of a unique MOND effect.

The prevailing opinion among most astrophysicists is that while modifications to general relativity can conceivably explain part of the observational evidence, there is probably enough data to conclude there must be some form of dark matter present in the Universe.

In popular culture 
Dark matter regularly appears as a topic in hybrid periodicals that cover both factual scientific topics and science fiction, and dark matter itself has been referred to as "the stuff of science fiction". Mention of dark matter is made in works of fiction. In such cases, it is usually attributed extraordinary physical or magical properties, thus becoming inconsistent with the hypothesized properties of dark matter in physics and cosmology. For example, dark matter serves as a plot device in the X-Files episode "Soft Light", in a manner that one reviewer found reliant upon the audience's ignorance. A dark-matter-inspired substance known as "Dust" features prominently in Philip Pullman's His Dark Materials trilogy, and beings made of dark matter are antagonists in Stephen Baxter's Xeelee Sequence.

More broadly, the phrase "dark matter" is used metaphorically to evoke the unseen or invisible.

Gallery

See also 

Related theories
 
 
 Density wave theory – A theory in which waves of compressed gas, which move slower than the galaxy, maintain galaxy's structure
 
 
 
 
Experiments
 , a search apparatus
 , large underground dark matter detector
 , a space mission
 
 , a research program
 , astrophysical simulations
 , a particle accelerator research infrastructure

Dark matter candidates
 
 
 
 
 
 
 
 
 
 Weakly interacting slim particle (WISP)Low-mass counterpart to WIMP
 
 
Other
 
 Luminiferous aether – A once theorized invisible and infinite material with no interaction with physical objects, used to explain how light could travel through a vacuum (now disproven)

Notes

References

Works cited

Further reading

External links 

 
 
 
 “Missing Dark Matter” in a far-away galaxy, Tech Explorer news item, from a 2020 Astrophysical Journal article, 
 
 
 
 
 
 
 
 
 
 

 
Physical cosmology
Celestial mechanics
Large-scale structure of the cosmos
Physics beyond the Standard Model
Astroparticle physics
Exotic matter
Matter
Theoretical physics
Concepts in astronomy
Unsolved problems in astronomy
Articles containing video clips
Dark concepts in astrophysics